Calvet is a Catalan surname.  The name may refer to:

People
Corinne Calvet (1925–2001), French actress
Damià Calvet (born 1968), Minister of Territory and Sustainability of the Catalan Government
Esprit Calvet (1728–1810), French physician and collector
Francisco Calvet (1921–2001), Catalan football player
François Calvet (born 1953), French politician from Northern Catalonia
Gérard Calvet (1927–2008), French abbot 
Jean Marc Calvet (born 1965), French artist
Joseph Calvet (1897–1984), French classical violinist
Laurent-Emmanuel Calvet (born 1969), French economist
Michel-Marie-Bernard Calvet (born 1944), New Caledonian archbishop
Pierre du Calvet (1735–1786), Canadian businessman
Pol Calvet (born 1994), Catalan football player
Raphaël Calvet (born 1994), French football player
Raul Donazar Calvet (1938–2008), Brazilian football player

Other uses
Casa Calvet, Barcelona, Spain
Fondation Calvet, French art foundation

See also
Calvert (name)

References

French-language surnames
Surnames